is a former Japanese football player.

Playing career
Tanabe was born in Ishikawa Prefecture on June 3, 1981. He joined the J1 League club Bellmare Hiratsuka (later Shonan Bellmare) from a youth team in 1999. On November 27, he debuted against Júbilo Iwata in the last match of the 1999 J1 League season. The club was relegated to the J2 League in 2000. He then played in many matches as an offensive midfielder. In 2004, he moved to the Japan Football League club Yokogawa Musashino. He became a regular player and played often over three seasons. He retired at the end of the 2006 season.

Club statistics

References

External links

1981 births
Living people
Association football people from Ishikawa Prefecture
Japanese footballers
J1 League players
J2 League players
Japan Football League players
Shonan Bellmare players
Tokyo Musashino United FC players
Association football midfielders